Sokon Group (officially Chongqing Sokon Industry Group Co., Ltd) is a Chinese company founded in September 1986 with headquarters in Chongqing, China. Born as a manufacturer of components for household appliances and shock absorbers, it currently produces cars, motorcycles and commercial vehicles as well as shock absorbers and internal combustion engines.

It operates through its subsidiaries DFSK Motor, Seres, XGJAO Motorbyke and Yu'an Shock Absorber Company.

History
The forerunner of the Sokon Group was Chongqing Baxian Fenghuang Electronic Factory (重庆巴县凤凰电器弹簧厂), a company founded in September 1986 by Zhang Xinghai and other shareholders, mainly engaged in the manufacture and sale of Japanese-licensed components for household appliances and springs for automotive seats. The products were destined for both the Chinese and Japanese markets and quickly achieved a market share in the sector of 90%. In September 1996 the Chongqing Yu'an Shock Absorber Company was established with the construction of a new plant for the production of shock absorbers for cars and motorcycles and the plant reached its maximum production capacity of over 1.5 million units per year. The company name became Chongqing Yu’an Innovation Technology (Group).

Given the enormous success in components, Chongqing Yu'an decided to enter directly into the automotive and motorcycle production sector by entering into numerous agreements with both Japanese and Chinese manufacturers to create the new range of vehicles.

In July 2002, XGJAO Motorbyke was founded, a manufacturer of low cost sports motorcycles intended mainly for a young audience and the first models on the market were launched (the F4 followed in the following years by the F5, F6 and F7).

For the automotive production, an agreement was signed with Suzuki for the licensed supply of chassis and engines for microvans and small commercial vehicles and on 27 June 2003, the new Dongfeng Yu'an Automobile 50:50 joint venture with headquarters in Chongqing and assembly plant in Wuhan was founded together with Dongfeng Motor Corporation. Subsequently, an engineering center for the design of electric vehicles called Chongqing Ruichi Automobile Company was created.

In 2005 the first vehicle of the joint venture went into production at the Dongfeng plant in Wuhan: the microvan Dongfeng Yu'an K-Series which was also be exported abroad (including Europe).

In May 2007 the entire industrial group changed its name to Chongqing Sokon Automobile Co., Ltd: the Yu'an brand was kept only to identify the production of shock absorbers and components, the Dongfeng Yu'an brand present on the minivans thus became Dongfeng Sokon (abbreviated to DFSK in overseas markets). In May 2012, the millionth vehicle of the Dongfeng Sokon joint venture was produced.

On 15 June 2016, the Sokon group was listed on the Shanghai Stock Exchange. In the same year, the first SUV-type vehicles, resulting from the joint venture with the Dongfeng group called DFSK Glory 580, went into production. In addition, the start-up SF Motors was founded in Santa Clara, California, with the intention of producing electric vehicles. SF Motors purchased AM General's manufacturing facility and opened three development and design centers for electric vehicles (one in California, one in Michigan and one in Chongqing).

In November 2018, the group restructured, with Sokon acquiring Dongfeng's share in the joint venture for 621 million euros, becoming sole owner of DFSK. In exchange, Dongfeng acquired 26.1% of Sokon for 620 million euros, becoming its majority shareholder.

In January 2019 an agreement was signed with Huawei for the development of information technologies and software for electric vehicles.

To improve the electric vehicle production in April 2022 Sokon signed an agreement with battery maker CATL, which will remain effective from 2022 to 2026.

In July 2022 the company name was changed in Seres Group.

References

External links 
 

Companies listed on the Shanghai Stock Exchange
Vehicle manufacturing companies established in 1986
Car manufacturers of China
Electric vehicle manufacturers of China
Chinese companies established in 1986
Chinese brands